Acalolepta flavidosignata is a species of beetle in the family Cerambycidae. It was described by Per Olof Christopher Aurivillius in 1927, originally under the genus Orsidis. It is known from the Philippines.

References

Acalolepta
Beetles described in 1927